Henry Ward Beecher (September 13, 1868 – September 26, 1948) was a college football player and sportswriter. He was the subject of the first American football card, printed in 1888. 

Henry was son of Henry Barton and Harriet Jones Benedict Beecher. His paternal grandfather was Henry Ward Beecher and one of his paternal great-aunts was Harriet Beecher Stowe. He graduated from Yale University in 1888.

Yale
Beecher was a prominent quarterback for the Yale Bulldogs football team of Yale University, called by one writer the school's greatest ever at the position.

1886
He accounted for 33 touchdowns in 1886.

1887
He was captain in 1887. One source lists Beecher as the player of the year.

References

American football quarterbacks
Yale Bulldogs football players
American sportswriters
19th-century players of American football
Beecher family
1867 births
1948 deaths